Lindsay Collegiate and Vocational Institute, commonly referred to as LCVI or LC is a secondary school in Lindsay, Ontario.

It is a part of the Trillium Lakelands District School Board. It was previously in the Victoria County Board of Education.

Notable alumni
 Bill Fitsell (1923–2020) was a Canadian journalist, historian and founder of the Society for International Hockey Research
 W. G. Hardy (1895–1979), President of the International Ice Hockey Federation and Member of the Order of Canada

See also
List of high schools in Ontario

References

High schools in Kawartha Lakes
Educational institutions in Canada with year of establishment missing

https://lcv.tldsb.on.ca/